Burchardia is a genus of herbs that are endemic to Australia.  The genus is named for Johann Heinrich Burkhardt, a German botanist.

 Species
 Burchardia bairdiae Keighery  
 Burchardia congesta Lindl.  
 Burchardia monantha Domin
 Burchardia multiflora Lindl.  
 Burchardia rosea Keighery
 Burchardia umbellata  R.Br. (milkmaids)

The last of these occurs in Tasmania, South Australia, Victoria, New South Wales and Queensland; the other five are endemic to Western Australia.

References

Footnotes

Colchicaceae
Colchicaceae genera
Monocots of Australia
Endemic flora of Australia